Joseph Cootmans (17 September 1904 – 30 September 1980) was a Belgian footballer. He played in one match for the Belgium national football team in 1926.

References

External links
 

1904 births
1980 deaths
Belgian footballers
Belgium international footballers
Place of birth missing
Association football midfielders
K. Berchem Sport players